Varnkatagh  or Lulasaz is a village that is, de facto, in the Martakert Province of the breakaway Republic of Artsakh; de jure, it is in the Tartar District of Azerbaijan, in the disputed region of Nagorno-Karabakh. The village has an ethnic Armenian-majority population, and also had an Armenian majority in 1989.

Toponymy 
The village was known as Hakob Kamari during the Soviet period.

History 
During the Soviet period, the village was part of the Mardakert District of the Nagorno-Karabakh Autonomous Oblast.

Economy and culture 
The population is mainly engaged in agriculture and animal husbandry. As of 2015, the village has a municipal building, the Varnkatagh branch of the Maghavuz Secondary School, and a medical centre.

Demographics 
The village had 68 inhabitants in 2005, and 95 inhabitants in 2015.

References

External links 
 
 

Populated places in Martakert Province
Populated places in Tartar District